Actia tarsata is an eastern Palearctic species of fly in the family Tachinidae.

Distribution
Chita in Eastern Siberia.

References

tarsata
Diptera of Asia
Insects described in 1980